Hubert Gerbeau (17 January 1937 – 3 April 2021) was a French historian and writer. He travelled to several places in the French-speaking world, including Réunion. A graduate of the University of Provence, he wrote several essays and novels on themes such as slavery.

Distinctions
Knight of the Legion of Honour

Works

Doctoral Thesis
L'esclavage et son ombre : l'île de Bourbon aux XIXe et XXe siècles, thèse de doctorat d'Etat (2005)

Essays
Martin Luther King (1968)
Les esclaves noirs : pour une histoire du silence (1970)
Les esclaves noirs : pour une histoire du silence (2013)
Outre-terre, outre-mer : cultures, colonialisme, impérialismes : mélanges pour Jacques Weber (2019)

Novels
Noc (2004)
Lia : d'un paradis à l'autre (2006)
La Négresse de paradis (2008)

References

1937 births
2021 deaths
Writers from Marseille
20th-century French historians
University of Provence alumni
Chevaliers of the Légion d'honneur
21st-century French historians